The 1962 Senior League World Series took place from August 17–18 in Williamsport, Pennsylvania, United States at Bowman Field. West Hempstead, New York defeated La Habra, California in the championship game. West Hempstead resident, Joseph J. Sarcona managed the team to victory. It was Long Island's first Little League World Series championship.

This was the first SLWS to feature the traditional geographical regions. It was the second, and final, edition to be held in Williamsport.

Teams

Results

References

Senior League World Series
Senior League World Series
1962 in sports in Pennsylvania
Baseball competitions in Pennsylvania